Joseph Kranzinger (14 February 1731, in Mattsee – 27 March 1775 in Versailles), alternatively Krantzinger, was an Austrian Rococo style pastel painter, best remembered for being commissioned by the Menus-Plaisirs du Roi to paint a portrait of Marie Antoinette in 1769, and for a later painting of the French queen which was misattributed to Jean-Étienne Liotard.

References 

1731 births
1775 deaths
Austrian painters